Wayne Horowitz  (born Roslyn, New York) is an archeologist and academic. He specialises in the ancient Near East and Assyriology.

Activities
Wayne Horowitz received his BA from Brandeis University. He completed his Ph.D. thesis (this later leading to the work Mesopotamian Cosmic Geography) at Birmingham University under the supervision of W. G. Lambert.
Horowitz lectures at the Rothberg School for Overseas Students in the Department of Assyriology.
Prof. Horowitz is leading a team making available in publication the decipherment of a law code fragment (18th-17th century BCE), the first found in Israel that shows features similar to the law code of Hammurabi. (From a website showing Copyright 2008 - 2011 AFHU )

Publications
His published works based on Sumerian and Akkadian texts written in cuneiform, these containing writings which in some way consider the structure of the Cosmos, are considered authoritative.

Books
with Rita Watson, Writing science before the Greeks: a naturalistic analysis of the Babylonian astronomical treatise MUL.APIN (2011)
 Mesopotamian Cosmic Geography. Winona Lake, ID: Eisenbrauns,
 The Astrolabes and Related Texts: Mesopotamian Astronomy Before 1000 B.C. Vienna: , Beiheft (supplement series), in preparation (as of...?)
with Takayoshi Oshima, Cuneiform in Canaan: Cuneiform Sources from the Land of Israel in Ancient Times, the Israel Exploration Society Jerusalem, 2006.
with P. Watson, A Catalogue of Cuneiform Tablets in the Birmingham City Museum (Volume 2) 1993; (Volume 1) 1986.

Articles
The Shofar and the Ancient Near East (Bible Lands Museum Jerusalem exhibition, September 2011)
 with Takayoshi Oshima and Avraham Winitzer, Hazor 17, the forthcoming IEJ, in press
 with Takayoshi Oshima, Hazor: a cuneiform city in Canaan: a retrospective and look forward in 6 ICAANE (2010)(6th International Congress of archeology in the Ancient Near East) Hazor 16, the forthcoming IEJ, in press, New Light on an Old Find from Hazor, in M. Cogan and D. Kahn eds., Treasures on Camels' Humps, Historical and Literary Studies from the Ancient Near East Presented to Israel Eph'al, Jerusalem, 2008, pp. 99–103 ","Hazor 15: Letter Fragment from Hazor, IEJ 57/1 (2007), pp. 34–41",
with Takayoshi Oshima and Siegfried Kreuzer, Die Keilschrifttexte von Taanach/ Tell Tacannek', in ibid., pp. 85–99,
 with Takayoshi Oshima, The Taanach Cuneiform Tablets, A Retrospective, in Siegfried Kreuzer ed., Taanach/Tell Tacannek: 100 Jahre Forschungen zur Archäologie, zur Geschichte, zu den Fundobjekten und zu den Keilschrifttexten, (Wiener Alltestamentliche Studien, Bd. 5), Frankfurt am Main, 2006, pp. 77–84,New Discovery on an Old Finding, in Qadmoniyot vol. 38/ 129 (2005), (in Hebrew), pp. 13–14", Cuneiform Tablets from Canaan in the Arkeologji Müzesi in Istanbul, Colloquium Anatolicum, (Institutum Turcicum Scientiae Antiquitatis)", Two More Cuneiform Finds from Hazor, IEJ 52 (2002), pp. 179-186",
A Kettle Drum ritual during Iyar-Seleucid Era 85 (March 2001) NABU 1991-80,The Amarna Age: Inscribed Clay Cylinder from Beth-Shean(1996),
Computed Tomography (CT) Imaging of Sealed Clay Cuneiform Tablets (in Hebrew). HaTebah Archaeologia WeMedeah 3 (1995) 8-12
with Takayoshi Oshima and Seth Sanders, A Bibliographical List of Cuneiform Inscriptions from Canaan, Palestine/Philistia, and The Land of Israel, JAOS 122 (2002), pp. 753–766 An Astronomical Fragment from Columbia University and the Babylonian Revolts against Xerxes Journal of Ancient Near Eastern Studies 23 (1994) 61-67;
 with S. Paul, Two Proposed Janus Parallelisms in Akkadian Literature. N.A.B.U. (1995) 11-12;
Two New Ziqpu-Star Texts. Journal of Cuneiform Studies 43 (1994) 89-98; A Join to Enuma Anu Enlil 50. Journal of Cuneiform Studies 43 (1994) 127-129; Moab and Edom in the Sargon Geography. Israel Exploration Journal 43 (1993) 151-156; "A Parallel to Shamash Hymn 11-12 and the Melammu of the Sun." N.A.B.U. (1993) 54-55; Mesopotamian Accounts of Creation. Encyclopedia of Cosmology. Ed. N. Hetherington (Garland Press, 1993) 387-397;
 with V. Hurowitz, Urim and Thummim in Light of a Psephomancy Ritual from Assur (LKA 137). Journal of Ancient Near Eastern Studies 21 (1992) 95-115;
 with A. Shaffer, "An Administrative Tablet from Hazor: A Preliminary Edition." Israel Exploration Journal 42 (1992) 21-33;
 with A. Shaffer, "A Fragment of a Letter from Hazor." Israel Exploration Journal 42 (1992) 165-167;

"Two Abnu-Sikinsu Fragments." Zeitschrift für Assyriologie 82 (1992) 112-121; "A Kettle-Drum Ritual during Iyar Seleucid Era 85." N.A.B.U. (1991) 52-53; "The Reverse of the Neo-Assyrian Planisphere CT 33 11." Grazer Morgenlandische Studien 3 (1991) 149-159; "Antiochus I, Esagil, and a Celebration of the Ritual for Renovation of Temples." Revue d'assyriologie 85 (1991) 75-77;

 with P. Watson,Further Notes on Birmingham Cuneiform Tablets volume I Acta Sumerologica 13 (1991) 409-417;

Two Notes on Etana's Flight to Heaven. Orientalia 59 (1990) 511-517; The Isles of the Nations: Genesis 10:5 and Babylonian Geography. Studies in the Pentateuch (Supplements to Vetus Testamentum XLI. Ed. J. A. Emerton 
(1990) 35-43; More Writings for Ursa Major with Determinative gis. N.A.B.U. (1990) 2-3; Two Mul-Apin Fragments. Archiv für Orientforschung 36/37 (1989/90) 116-117; A Middle-Assyrian Exemplar of Urra. Archiv für Orientforschung 35 (1989) 161-178; An Akkadian Name for Ursa-Minor: mar.gid.da.an.na = eriqqi samami. Zeitschrift für Assyriologie 79 (1989) 242-245; The Babylonian Map of the World. Iraq 47 (1988) 147-165;

 with D. Geva, Antiochus IV in Life and Death: The Babylonian Astronomical Diaries. Journal of the American Oriental Society (in press);
Birmingham Astronomical Cuneiform Texts. Festschrift for W. G. Lambert (in press); 
Halley's Comet and Judean Revolts Revisited. Catholic Biblical Quarterly (in press); Unrest in Canaan: An Amarna Period on a Letter from Bet Shean (in Hebrew). Kadmoniot (in press).

See also
City of David (Silwan)
Babylonian astronomy

References 

original source:Faculty of the Hebrew University

External links
bib-arch.org retrieved 09:25 20/10/2011 (review of Cuneiform in Canaan: Cuneiform Sources from the Land of Israel in Ancient Times  from Biblical Archeological Review-magazine  reviewer: Herschel Shanks)
the Hebrew University of Jerusalem retrieved 27 December 2019 (in 5th of 6th paragraphs of text: W. Horowitz & Dr. Takayoshi Oshima (University Leipzig) -  Oldest written document ever found in Jerusalem discovered by Hebrew University researchers)
Published 03:29 27.07.10 retrieved 11:50 20/10/2011 (further information on the cuneiform finding from Hazor)

American Assyriologists
Living people
Alumni of the University of Birmingham
Academic staff of the Hebrew University of Jerusalem
Brandeis University alumni
People from Roslyn, New York
Year of birth missing (living people)